Karin Okolie (born May 1, 1994 in Sofia) is a Bulgarian athlete who specialises in the women's 100 metres and 200 metres sprint events. In 2022, she was a participant in the 6th season of Survivor BG.

Career overview

Childhood and junior years

Senior career
At the 2015 European Athletics Championships, she finished 2nd in the women's 4 × 400 m.

Personal
Okolie's mother is Bulgarian while her father is from Nigeria.

Podcast 
In 2020, Okolie launched Kari's calling.

Statistics

Personal bests

All information from IAAF Profile

References

External links 
 Official Facebook page
 Results
 

1994 births
Living people
Bulgarian female sprinters
Athletes (track and field) at the 2010 Summer Youth Olympics
European Athletics Championships medalists
Sportspeople from Sofia